Pieter Nason (bapt. 16 February 1612,  Amsterdam - 1688/90, The Hague) was a Dutch painter. He became a member of the Guild of Painters of The Hague in 1639, and in 1656 was one of the forty seven members who established the Pictura Society. From a MS. by Pieter Terwesten, it appears not improbable that Nason was a pupil of Jan van Ravensteyn; and it is believed that his name has been effaced from pictures since attributed to Mierevelt, Moreelse, and above all to Ravensteyn. At Berlin there is a full-length portrait, dated 1667, of the latter, by Nason; also a still life, representing gold, silver, and glass vessels, likewise a portrait by him signed and dated 1670. There are others at Copenhagen and at Rotterdam. The date of his death is not known, but his life was long. Redgrave gives the initial of his Christian name wrongly as R.

Notes

References
Nason, Pieter at the Netherlands Institute for Art History.

Attribution:

External link

1612 births
1680s deaths
Painters from Amsterdam
Artists from The Hague
Dutch Golden Age painters
Dutch male painters
Painters from The Hague